School Dance is a 2014 American musical comedy-drama film directed, co-written, and produced by Nick Cannon. The film stars Bobb'e J. Thompson, Luenell, Mike Epps, George Lopez, Lil Duval, Katt Williams, and Wilmer Valderrama. The film was released on July 2, 2014, in select theaters, VOD, and Digital HD. It is Cannon's directorial feature film debut.

Plot
The film opens with a news broadcast about a teenager named Jason Jackson being shot outside the Monte Vista High School dance lock-in. Jason tells the story from the beginning, starting with him trying to get into the most popular dance clique in school, The Ranger$. They say he has to pass the initiation of getting a pair of panties from one of the Sweet Gyrls by midnight. Jason then decides that he is going to attempt to get a pair of panties from his longtime crush Anastacia during the school's lock-in.

Meanwhile, Day Day, one of the Ranger$ and Jason's older cousin, owes Anastacia's eldest brother Junior $2,000 by midnight due to Day Day's father Darren telling Junior that Day Day would have his money after losing to him in a game of dominoes. In his English class, Jason gives Anastacia a poem he wrote about her after she forgets to do the homework assignment only for the teacher to make her read it in front of the class, which everyone including Anastacia finds to be very great. After school is over, Anastacia gives Jason her number, so they can write a song together sometime.

Another subplot of the film follows two police officers Officer P'eniss and Lagney, who are chasing down the New Boyz who are on their way to the lock-in but get caught with weed brownies and "grape juice", which Officer Lagney consumes.

At the school dance lock-in, Jason, Anastacia, the Ranger$, and Sweet Gyrls play "seven minutes in heaven", but when it is Jason and Anastacia's turn, she tells him that she already knows his plan, and they decide to just stay friends. They later compete in a talent show to win $2,000 but when it comes to the Ranger$' performance, Jason finally beats his fear and raps to help them win the money. However, the Sweet Gyrls end up winning the prize money.

At midnight, Jason and the Ranger$ meet the Eses in the parking lot and are about to be killed until the wannabe gangsters start a drive-by shooting. Jason saves Anastacia, but is shot in the process. Jason is sent to the hospital and Anastacia goes with him, becomes his girlfriend, and gives the $2,000 prize money to Flaco.

The film ends with Jason's mother, Mamma Tawanna, coming into the parking lot with a gun, trying to figure out who shot Jason and breaks the fourth wall by showing Nick, the producers, and the crew then her shouting out at the audience.

Cast
 Bobb'e J. Thompson as Jason Jackson
 Juliann Alexander as Julian
 Langston Higgins as Langston
 Dashawn Blanks as Darren Jr. (Day Day) 
 Luenell as Mamma Tawanna Jackson
 Mike Epps as Principal Rogers
 George Lopez as Oscar
 Katt Williams as Darren
 Wilmer Valderrama as Flaco
 Tiffany Haddish as Trina
 Kristinia DeBarge as Anastacia
 Lil Duval as Bam-Bam
 Affion Crockett as Coach Fontaine
 Amber Rose as MaryWanna
 Efren Ramirez as El Matador
 Patrick Warburton as Prairie Puff Man
 Kevin Hart as OG Lil' Pretty Thug (uncredited)
 New Boyz as Themselves
 Melissa Molinaro as Tequila
 Kayla Collins as Big Booty Becky
 Jim Breuer as Officer Lagney
 Vivian Kindle as Mrs. Johnson
 Jessica Kirson as Officer P'eniss
 Nick Cannon as Super Sizer/Juicy/Himself
 DJ D-Wrek as himself
 Pete Davidson as Stinkfinger

Home media
School Dance was released on DVD on October 7, 2014.

References

External links
 
 

2014 films
2014 comedy-drama films
2014 directorial debut films
2010s high school films
2010s hip hop films
2010s musical comedy-drama films
2010s teen comedy-drama films
American dance films
American high school films
American musical comedy-drama films
American teen comedy-drama films
American teen musical films
African-American films
Films scored by Geoff Zanelli
Films shot in Los Angeles
Lionsgate films
2010s English-language films
2010s American films